Athinumappuram is a 1987 Indian Malayalam-language film, directed by Thevalakkara Chellappan. The film stars Mammootty, Geetha, Jagathy Sreekumar, Mukesh and Adoor Bhavani. The film has musical score by Johnson.

Cast
Mammootty
Geetha
Jagathy Sreekumar
Mukesh
Adoor Bhavani
Shari
Jagannatha Varma
Mamukkoya
Valsala Menon

Soundtrack
The music was composed by Johnson and the lyrics were written by Poovachal Khader.

References

External links
 

1987 films
1980s Malayalam-language films
Films directed by Thevalakkara Chellappan